Christiaan Pieter Wilhelm Kriens (Dresden, April 29, 1881 – West Hartford, December 17, 1934) was an American composer, pianist, violinist and conductor of Dutch parentage.

He was born in Germany while his father, clarinetist Christiaan Pieter Willem Kriens, was playing with the Sächsische Staatskapelle in Dresden during the 1880/1881 season. he came to the United States in 1906. He wrote a number of pieces for orchestra, including two symphonies (when he was very young); he also composed songs and some chamber music, including a string quartet.

He received his education form his father and at the Haagse Muziekschool. When he was fourteen he gave a concert with the orchestra led by his father, during which he was the violin soloist in the Violin Concerto by Ludwig van Beethoven, and the pianist the Piano Cocerto No. 5 by the same composer and led his own second symphony as a conductor. He became solo violinist in the Haarlemse Orkest Vereeniging (predecessor of Noordhollands Philharmonisch Orkest) before joining orchestras in France and the United States. He ran an orchestra school in Carnegie Hall (Kriens Symphony Club) and a string quartet.

In November, 1910 Musical America published an interview with Kriens with the headline: "No Wealth, No Friends, No Influence, Yet Optimistic" 

He became musical director of WTIC, a radio station with choir and orchestra, in West Hartford, Connecticut. When he was fired he killed himself.

References

J.H. Letzer: Muzikaal Nederland 1850-1910. Bio-bibliographisch woordenboek van Nederlandsche toonkunstenaars en toonkunstenaressen - Alsmede van schrijvers en schrijfsters op muziek-literarisch gebied, 2. uitgaaf met aanvullingen en verbeteringen. Utrecht: J. L. Beijers, 1913, page 96
Geïllustreerd muzieklexicon, onder redactie van Mr. G. Keller en Philip Kruseman, medewerking van Sem Dresden, Wouter Hutschenruijter (1859-1943), Willem Landré, Alexander Voormolen en Henri Zagwijn; uitgegeven in 1932/1949 bij J. Philips Kruseman, Den Haag; page 360. 
Dutch musicians
WTIC Alumni
Christiaan Kriens at Worldcat.org
Rouwadvertentie Haarlem’s Dagblad, 19 december 1934

External links

1881 births
1934 deaths
American male classical composers
American classical composers
American people of Dutch descent
Musicians from Dresden
20th-century classical composers
American male conductors (music)
20th-century American conductors (music)
20th-century American composers
20th-century American male musicians